Lija Brīdaka (3 September 1932 – 19 September 2022) was a Latvian poet.

References

1932 births
2022 deaths
Latvian poets
People from Alūksne